Bohus may refer to:

Bohus Fortress, Sweden
Bohuslän, a historical province in Sweden, named after the fortress
Bohus, a locality, part of Surte, Ale Municipality, Sweden
Bohus (retailer), Norwegian furniture retailer
MS Bohus, Norwegian-Swedish ferry
Gábor Bohus, Hungarian mycologist
Ted A. Bohus, American film director, producer, actor and writer